Never a Backward Step is a 1966 documentary film, produced by the National Film Board of Canada and directed by Donald Brittain, Arthur Hammond and John Spotton. It is a profile of Canadian press magnate Roy Thomson.

Awards
 American Film and Video Festival, New York: Blue Ribbon, First Prize, Biography & History, 1968
 20th Canadian Film Awards, Toronto: Best Documentary Over 30 Minutes, 1968

References

External links
 Never a Backward Step at the National Film Board of Canada
 

1966 films
1966 documentary films
Canadian documentary films
Films directed by Donald Brittain
Best Documentary Film Genie and Canadian Screen Award winners
1960s English-language films
1960s Canadian films